The 1257 imperial election was a double election in which the prince-electors of the Holy Roman Empire split into factions and elected two rivals, earl Richard of Cornwall and King Alfonso X of Castile, each claiming to have been legally elected.

Background 
The imperial elections of 1257 took place during a period known as the Great Interregnum of The Holy Roman Empire. In July 1245, Pope Innocent IV declared Frederick II, Holy Roman Emperor deposed, opening a split between the factions Guelphs and Ghibellines. This led to a period of chaos, as various figures tried to become King of the Romans. With the death of Conrad IV in 1254 and his rival claimant William of Holland in 1256, an imperial election became necessary.

The following prince-electors were called: 

 Archbishop Elector of Mainz, 
Konrad von Hochstaden, Archbishop Elector of Cologne, 
Arnold II of Isenburg Archbishop Elector of Trier, 
Albert I Elector of Saxony, 
Louis, Elector Palatine, 
Ottokar II, the Carantanian duke of Styria and Austria and Arch-Pincerna of the Empire exercising the rights of his then wife Margaret of Austria, Queen of Bohemia.
John I, Margrave of Brandenburg and Otto III, Margrave of Brandenburg, Margraves of Brandenburg.

The two leading candidates were Alfonso X of Castile and Richard of Cornwall. The pope and King Louis IX of France initially favored Alfonso, but they were convinced by the influential relatives of Richard's sister-in-law, the Eleanor of Provence, to support Richard. 

With seven electors, it was necessary to gain at least four votes. Richard was backed by three German Electoral Princes (Cologne, Mainz, and the Palatinate), while Saxony, Brandenburg, and Trier supported Alfonso X of Castile. Ottokar II of Bohemia at first backed Richard before switching his support to Alfonso, and finally returned to supporting Richard, giving Richard the required simple majority. This led to his election in 1256 as King of Germany. Richard had to bribe four of the electors to secure the election, at an enormous cost of 28,000 marks.

Election and aftermath
Richard of Cornwall was elected but only after a highly partisan election. On May 27, 1257, Konrad von Hochstaden, archbishop of Cologne himself crowned Richard "King of the Romans" in Aachen; Like his lordships in Gascony and Poitou, his title of Germany never held much significance, and he made only four brief visits to Germany between 1257 and 1269.

References

Bibliography

1256
1257 in Europe
Non-partisan elections
Alfonso X of Castile